Michael Haynes is an American sports broadcaster. Until 2018, he was the play-by-play TV broadcaster for the Colorado Avalanche ice hockey team with Altitude Sports and Entertainment.  He also called games for the Colorado Mammoth and the Colorado Rapids, as well as hosting Altitude's One-on-One show.  Haynes has twice been honored as Denver's Best Sportscaster by Westword magazine.  Mike has a wife, Victoria, and two children, daughter Kiara and son Kian.  They currently reside in Littleton, Colorado. He also has 5 brothers and sisters. One of them Carl Haynes resides in Seattle, Washington with his children Maya and Carl and his wife Susan.

Broadcasting roles
Being one of the most versatile sports broadcasters, Haynes also calls games for many other sports besides ice hockey, including Colorado Rapids soccer, Colorado Springs Sky Sox baseball, Colorado Mammoth lacrosse, college football and basketball, rodeo, wrestling, and boxing.  Previously, Haynes was also the play-by-play announcer for Colonial Hockey League's Utica Bulldogs (1993-4) and the Capital District Islanders of the American Hockey League.  Haynes also called the national championships of golden gloves boxing on Fox Sports in 2002.

Brain Aneurysm
On April 7, 2008, Haynes was diagnosed with a brain aneurysm of his basilar artery. He successfully underwent surgery for the problem two days later  but was unable to do the play by play for the Colorado Avalanche in the 2008 Stanley Cup playoffs. Former Avalanche and current St. Louis Blues announcer John Kelly filled in during Haynes's absence.

See also
Colorado Avalanche
Colorado Rapids
Colorado Mammoth
Altitude Sports and Entertainment
Peter McNab

References

Bio on altitude.tv
Bio on coloradoavalanche.com
Aneurysm article on coloradoavalanche.com

National Hockey League broadcasters
Minor League Baseball broadcasters
Boxing commentators
College football announcers
College basketball announcers in the United States
Lacrosse announcers
Living people
American Hockey League broadcasters
American soccer commentators
Year of birth missing (living people)